The Maloka Museum is an interactive science museum located in Bogotá, Colombia. Visitors interact with a wide variety of exhibits that explore topics in science and technology.

The museum has 9 rooms, with different science and technology topics; the Telecommunications Room shows interactive games about the Binary System, the Computers' language, how cellphones work and the communication process.

The next room is The City: it shows different modules where you can see 3D images of Bogotá with glasses, the development and history of the city, and a model of the city showing all the buildings in it.

The Human is a room where visitors can explore the perfect machine: the human body.

The Universe room is one of the most popular rooms in the museum, where visitors can do experiments, such as knowing a person's weight on the various planets of Solar System.

Petroleum is another room located on the second floor. There one can see the process of exploring and exploiting that treasure, and its different kinds and characteristics.

The Water Room shows you through games the physical and chemical characteristics of that liquid; the others are the Biodiversity and Boys & Girls' room.

The museum has an Activity Zone with math games and activities too.

The museum has a dome theater where documentaries are shown.

See also
 Geodesic dome

Hours of Operation
Monday to Friday: 8am. at 5pm., Saturdays 10am. to 7pm., Sundays and public holidays: 11am. at 7pm.

External links
  Official Site
   Places To Go in Bogotá: Maloka Interactive Center video and information

Science museums
Landmarks in Colombia
Museums in Bogotá